Human Being is the third studio album by Seal, released in 1998. The title track was written about late rappers Tupac Shakur and The Notorious B.I.G. Human Being received mixed reviews ranging from being panned for its overtly dark and moody feel, to being described in terms such as "pop perfection". The album failed to sell in the same way as his 1994 multi-platinum album, Seal. However, it is a fan favourite and was inspired by his then-girlfriend, Tyra Banks and their breakup.

A remix of "Lost My Faith" was featured over the closing credits of the 1999 film Entrapment, and the song's single release was accompanied by a music video in which Seal is integrated into scenes from the film alongside Sean Connery and Catherine Zeta-Jones.

The cover art for the album was shot by French fashion photographer Jean-Baptiste Mondino.

Track listing

Personnel
 Seal – vocals, guitar, bass guitar
 Earl Harvin – drums, bass, guitar, sound engineering
 Chris Bruce – guitar, bass guitar
 Jamie Muhoberac – keyboards, bass guitar, programming
 Grant Mitchell – additional keyboards, programming
 Dave Palmer, David Sancious, Mike Garson, George De Angelis, Lisa Coleman – additional keyboards
 Gregg Arreguin, Chester Kayman, Gus Isadore, Wendy Melvoin, Ramon Stagnaro, Danny Saber – additional guitar
 Alex Acuña, Andy Duncan – percussion
 Andy Richards, Dave McCracken, Danny Saber, William Orbit – programming
 Anne Dudley, Wil Malone, Aaron Zigman, Nick Ingman – string arrangements

Charts

Certifications

References

1998 albums
Seal (musician) albums
Albums produced by Trevor Horn
Warner Records albums